Fortune magazine gives an annual award for the person it considers to be the European Businessman of the Year. Fortune is based in the United States, but it has a European edition which features this award prominently. Currently the award is announced in January for the preceding calendar year. Other organisations also issue similar awards.

Recipients
This list is incomplete.

Business and industry awards
European awards